Filipovo is a village (село) in southwestern Bulgaria, located in the Bansko Municipality of the Blagoevgrad Province 1 km east of the road Bansko - Gotse Delchev on the Eastern bank of the Mesta River.

Population 
The village of Filipovo had 602 inhabitants at the end of 2019.

References

Villages in Blagoevgrad Province